The 2015 Basildon Borough Council election took place on 7 May 2015, as part of the 2015 United Kingdom local elections, and took place alongside the UK General Election. One third of seats were up for election, with these seats last being contested in 2011. As a result of the election, the council remained in no overall control. The Conservative Party remained as the largest party, and formed a minority administration.

Results

The turnout was 62.9%, and there were 376 ballots rejected. All comparisons in vote share are to the corresponding 2011 election.

Council Composition

Following the 2014 election, the composition of the council was:

On the eve on the 2015 election, the composition of the council was:

After the election, the composition of the council was:

IND - Independent
IG - Independence Group
L - Liberal Democrats

Ward Results
An asterisk denotes an incumbent councillor seeking re-election.

Billericay East

Billericay West

Burstead

Fryerns

Laindon Park

Lee Chapel North

Nethermayne

Pitsea North West

Pitsea South East

St Martin's

Vange

Wickford Castledon

Note: The ward had been won by the Conservatives at the last regular election in 2011, but gained by UKIP in a by-election in 2013.

Wickford North

Wickford Park

References

2015 English local elections
May 2015 events in the United Kingdom
2015
2010s in Essex